Heck may refer to:

 Heck (band), a British rock band
 Heck (surname)
 Heck, Dumfries and Galloway, Scotland
 Heck, North Yorkshire, England
 Heck cattle
 Heck horse
 Heck reaction, a chemical reaction that forms a substituted alkene
 Parnall Heck, a 1930s British four-seat cabin monoplane
 NOAAS Heck (S 591), originally USC&GS Heck, a survey ship
 A minced oath for "hell"
 Heck (film), a 2020 Canadian film

Hecke may refer to:
 Hecke algebra (disambiguation) 
 Hecke character
 Hecke operator
 Hecke (surname)